Dungur (or Dungur 'Addi Kilte) is the ruins of a substantial mansion in Aksum, Ethiopia, the former capital city of the Kingdom of Aksum. The ruins are in the western part of Aksum, across the road from the Gudit stelae field.

Dungur is known locally and popularly as the Palace of the Queen of Sheba (i.e. the Palace of Makeda in Ethiopia).

Description

The remains of the mansion and its associated building are limited to the lowest levels and the podium, covering about 3,250 square meters. During its prime, a double staircase led into the entrance of the complex, which opened into one of the courtyards surrounding the central structure.

In the associated buildings a number of stone piers were recovered, "presumably for supporting wooden columns or floors", and brickwork which might be evidence of a hypocaust. However, the purpose of these buildings is unclear. Munro-Hay notes, "The 'rooms' with stone piers have no doorways, and the piers presumably supported floors, but occasional divisions on the same level do have doorways, implying that not all the lower level was merely a podium for a higher floor level. Possibly some rooms were entered from within by ladders."

Archaeology

S. Puglisi performed the first archaeological excavation in this area, excavating a 3 x 5 meter sondage with the intent of revealing its stratification. The next excavations in this area were conducted in 1966–1968 by Francis Anfray, who uncovered a dwelling 250 meters west of Puglisi's trench that he described as a "château", inhabited by one of the city's elite. Based on the evidence from these excavations, Butzer dated Anfray's dwelling to the seventh century; he pointed out that the masonry was similar to the base of St Mary of Zion church (which is part of the original structure that dated from Axumite times), while the floor plan was similar to the layout of the central block of the Ta'akha Maryam palace.

References

Aksumite Empire
Axum (city)
Archaeological sites in Ethiopia
Sheba
Architecture in Ethiopia
Archaeological sites of Eastern Africa